The Billy Goat Trail is a  hiking trail that follows a path between the C&O Canal and the Potomac River within the Chesapeake and Ohio Canal National Historical Park near the Great Falls in Montgomery County, Maryland.

Description
The Billy Goat Trail was laid out by the YMCA Triangle Club in 1919.

Section A of the trail, by far the most popular, is on Bear Island and traverses rough and rocky terrain, including a steep climb along a cliff face along the Potomac River's Mather Gorge.  At another point in the trail, hikers are required to scramble over and around huge boulders. Sections B and C are less strenuous; section B requires only one brief scramble, and section C has none. Most of the trail is well marked with light blue trail blazes.

Currently, Section B is closed due to trail damage.

Section A is best accessed from the Great Falls Tavern Visitor Center. Section B and Section C are best accessed from the Carderock Recreation Area. All sections of the trail are free, although an entrance fee ($20 per car in 2021) is charged when entering and parking near the Great Falls Tavern Visitor Center. No fee is charged when parking near Carderock. Dogs are not allowed on Section A, nor on Olmsted Island (location of the Great Falls overlook), but are permitted on a leash at all times everywhere else in the park. It takes about 2 1/2 hours to walk the Section A loop from the parking lot.

The three sections of the trail do not directly connect with each other, but are connected to each other by the towpath along the C&O Canal.

Section A gallery 
Pictures are approximately upstream to downstream on the trail.

Section B gallery

Section C gallery

References

External links

 Great Falls Trail Descriptions (PDF) from the National Park Service website
 Great Falls Trail Map (PDF), Page 1 and Page 2 from the National Park Service website
 The Washington Post.  City Guide: Billy Goat Trail

Protected areas of Montgomery County, Maryland
Hiking trails in Maryland
National Park Service areas in Maryland
Protected areas established in 1919
1919 establishments in Maryland
Chesapeake and Ohio Canal National Historical Park